Avanti! is a 1972 American/Italian international co-production comedy film produced and directed by Billy Wilder, and starring Jack Lemmon and Juliet Mills. The screenplay by Wilder and I. A. L. Diamond is based on Samuel A. Taylor's play, which had a short run for the 1968 Broadway season. The film follows a businessman attempting to deliver the body of his father from Italy. It premiered on December 17, 1972. Lemmon won the Golden Globe Award for Best Actor – Motion Picture Musical or Comedy. The film was nominated for five Golden Globe Awards, including Best Motion Picture – Musical or Comedy, Best Director, Best Actress – Motion Picture Comedy or Musical, and Best Screenplay.

Plot
For the last decade, Baltimore industrialist Wendell Armbruster Sr. has annually spent a month at the Grand Hotel Excelsior on the resort island of Ischia on the Bay of Naples, allegedly to soak in the therapeutic mud baths. During his last visit he died in an automobile accident, and his straitlaced son Wendell Armbruster Jr. travels to Ischia to claim the body. He meets Pamela Piggott, a London traveler, who has come to claim the body of her mother. Wendell discovers his father had an affair with Pamela's mother for every one of those ten years, despite his having had a wife in Baltimore. Pamela knows of their parents' clandestine annual meeting. Hotel manager Carlo Carlucci plans a funeral and the delivery of Wendell Senior's remains in three days time so Wendell Junior can take his father's body back to the family home for a funeral to be viewed on television by all the workers in his father's factories. They are delayed at every turn due to the twin Italian traditions of bureaucracy and short working hours.

Pamela asks Wendell to bury their parents together on their beloved Ischia. When the bodies vanish from the morgue, Wendell suspects Pamela. However, the bodies were stolen by the brothers of the Trotta family, whose vineyard was damaged in the accident. Wendell discovers another Italian tradition, extortion. The Trottas spirited the remains away from the morgue, holding them for a two million lire ransom. At the same time, hotel valet Bruno wants to return to America from which he had been deported since he is Italian. Bruno has compromising photos of Wendell's father and Pamela's mother and plans to use blackmail to make his dreams come true. As Wendell and Pamela swim naked, Bruno take a snapshot of them and tries to force Wendell to use his influence to get him an American visa. However, the maid, Anna - whom Bruno has impregnated and seeks to flee Italy to avoid marrying her - kills Bruno in Pamela's room while Pamela is away. Carlucci moves Pamela's property to Wendell's room to prevent her being involved in the incident, but Pamela believes that Wendell has surprised her and ordered the move so the pair can stay together as lovers. Meanwhile, back in the States, Wendell's wife uses her connections to send State Department Agent J.J. Blodgett from Paris to quickly expedite the matter. Wendell and Pamela at last fall in love and have their parents interred together in the Carlucci family cemetery, and place Bruno's remains in a coffin marked as Wendell Senior, granting Bruno's wish to return to the United States.

After enjoying himself in the mud baths, Blodgett appoints Wendell Senior to an embassy post, in the interest of Equal Opportunity Employment by not discriminating regardless of health.  Blodgett then has Wendell Senior's coffin, which is carrying Bruno's remains, sent to America in a diplomatic pouch. Carlucci  promises Pamela and Wendell to have a room ready for a month in a year's time just like he did for their parents. Wendell and Blodgett leave Ischia and head to the airport in Rome on a U.S. Navy helicopter.

Cast

Production

Development 
Although Taylor's play had closed on Broadway in early 1968 after 21 performances, (it was profiled in the William Goldman book The Season: A Candid Look at Broadway) talent agent Charles Feldman, who previously had interested Wilder in filming The Seven Year Itch, had purchased the screen rights and offered the property to the director. Wilder began working on The Private Life of Sherlock Holmes, and it was not until that film was completed that he focused on Avanti! Diamond was absent, and Wilder collaborated first with Julius J. Epstein and Norman Krasna but he was unhappy with them. Diamond became free, and with the ultimately uncredited assistance of Luciano Vincenzoni, he and Wilder adapted the play. Wilder was determined to create "a bittersweet love story, a little like 'Brief Encounter,' which I always admired," he later recalled. After viewing a number of Italian films, Wilder selected cinematographer Luigi Kuveiller based on his work on Elio Petri's 1969 film A Quiet Place in the Country.

Casting 
Early in the writing period, Wilder showed Jack Lemmon some of the completed script and he agreed to play Wendell Armbruster Jr. "Knowing pretty early on Jack was going to be in our film made it more comfortable writing his dialogue," said Diamond, who preferred to tailor a screenplay to a specific actor. Wilder was a fan of Mills from the television sitcom Nanny and the Professor. He disliked the series but enjoyed watching the show to see her, as he considered her a good actress with a lot of appeal. He contacted her and personally offered her the role of Pamela Piggott. "I loved Billy Wilder just calling me and asking me to be in his film," the actress recalled, "no lawyer or agent, his voice, not asking for an audition or a screen test." Wilder told her the role required her to gain 25 pounds, and Mills agreed. She also agreed to a nude scene, although Diamond was opposed to including one in the film. "I think nudity hurts laughs," he stated. "I mean, if you're watching somebody's boobs, you're not listening to the dialogue."

Filming 
The film is set on the island of Ischia, where some of the exterior scenes were shot, including a brief scene outside the morgue (the interior of which, as with all the interior sets, was designed by Italian production designer Ferdinando Scarfiotti); at and around the port of Ischia, where Lemmon and Mills visit the island; and on a small rock jutting out of the water just off the shore of Ischia, where the nudity scenes were shot. However, most of the exteriors were filmed in Sorrento, including the exterior of Lemmon's hotel; on Capri, notably the hilltop heliport overlooking the Tyrrhenian Sea; and along the Amalfi Coast. Interiors were filmed on Scarfiotti's sets (including the interior lobby and hotel rooms) at Safa Palatino Studios in Rome following location shooting during the summer of 1972. Principal photography was completed on schedule and $100,000 under budget. Wilder reported that he was disappointed with the film. "Maybe we went overboard with some of the comic relief, because 'Avanti!' is not a comedy," he stated. "If this film had worked the way we wanted it to, it would have had more of the quality of 'The Apartment.' I always feel sorry for the disappointment of the actors, and all those dear technical people who do so much, when the picture doesn't make it the way they hoped. I went much farther with forbidden themes than I had with 'Kiss Me, Stupid,' but nobody cared. Audiences thought it was too long and too bland. I guess they would have liked it better if it turned out the father was having the affair with one of the bellboys at the hotel."

Music 
The film's musical score was composed and arranged by Carlo Rustichelli, and conducted by Gianfranco Plenizio. The score incorporates and adapted several classic Italian songs, including “Palcoscenico” (Sergio Bruni, composers  E. Bonagura, Chianese), “Senza Fine” (Ornella Vanoni, composer G. Paoli), “Un’ora sola ti vorrei” (Nuccia Natali, composers P. Marchetti and U. Bertini) and "La Luna" (Milva, composers Detto Mariano, and Don Backy)

Critical reception
A.H. Weiler of The New York Times thought the film was "intermittently funny, charming, cute and, unfortunately, over-long." He continued, "Wilder, Lemmon and I.A.L. Diamond . . . fitfully charm us but they haven't moved forward at any great comic clip. They have warped some parts of the playwright's plot to give us a fairly reasonable flow of giggles and an occasional guffaw." He cited "a fine job turned in by Clive Revill."

Roger Ebert of the Chicago Sun-Times called the film "a pleasant, civilized comedy" and added, "Avanti! isn't a laugh-a-minute kind of a movie, and it's too long by maybe half an hour. It also suffers from the problem that the audience has everything figured out several minutes before Jack Lemmon does. Still, the movie has a certain charm, some of which seeps in along with the locations, and there is in most of the many Wilder/Lemmon collaborations a cheerful insouciance, as if life is best approached with a cheerful, if puzzled, grin."

Jay Cocks of Time observed, "The topical dialogue by Wilder and I.A.L. Diamond — Kissinger jokes, Billy Graham jokes, etc. — gives this passingly pleasant movie the sound of a Bob Hope TV special. But Miss Mills is fresh and winning, and there is a deft performance by Clive Revill."

The British television network Channel 4 has called the film "a rare instance of the travel comedy - never an easy thing to pull off - succeeding without recourse to old racial stereotypes . . . As a love story, it's full of Wilder's biting satire . . . Taken at face value, it's simply a travel comedy about funny foreigners and love in the Mediterranean. Yet what stands out is how uncomfortable Wilder seems to be with making a sex comedy in the 1970s. Forced to take on board the aftershocks of the summer of love but saddled with an old man's attitude and an old man's cast, Wilder seems perilously out of his depth. As Lemmon and Mills strip off to reveal pale white skin and flabby fat, you can't help feeling that the resolutely misanthropic director is somewhat appalled by the realities of his characters' bedroom antics."

Accolades
Lemmon won the Golden Globe Award for Best Actor – Motion Picture Musical or Comedy, and nominations went to Billy Wilder for Best Director, Wilder and I.A.L. Diamond for Best Screenplay, Juliet Mills for Best Actress, Clive Revill for Best Supporting Actor, and the film itself for Best Motion Picture (Musical or Comedy). There were no Academy Award nominations. Wilder and Diamond were nominated for the Writers Guild of America Award for Best Comedy Adapted from Another Medium but lost to Jay Presson Allen for Cabaret.

Golden Globe Awards
 Best Actor – Motion Picture Musical or Comedy: Jack Lemmon (won)
 Best Actress – Motion Picture Comedy or Musical: Juliet Mills (nominated)
 Best Supporting Actor – Motion Picture: Clive Revill (nominated)
 Best Motion Picture – Musical or Comedy (nominated)
 Best Director: Billy Wilder (nominated)
 Best Screenplay: Billy Wilder & I.A.L. Diamond (nominated)

Writers Guild of America Awards
 Best Adapted Screenplay: Billy Wilder & I.A.L. Diamond (nominated)

Home media
MGM Home Entertainment released the Region 1 DVD on July 15, 2003. It is in anamorphic widescreen format with audio tracks, and subtitles in English, French and Spanish.

See also

 List of American films of 1972
 List of Italian films of 1972

References

External links

1972 films
1972 comedy films
1970s sex comedy films
American comedy films
American romantic comedy films
American sex comedy films
American films based on plays
Italian comedy films
Italian romantic comedy films
Italian sex comedy films
Italian films based on plays
English-language Italian films
Films directed by Billy Wilder
Films scored by Carlo Rustichelli
United Artists films
Films featuring a Best Musical or Comedy Actor Golden Globe winning performance
Films set in Italy
Films set in Naples
Plays by Samuel A. Taylor
Films with screenplays by Billy Wilder
Films with screenplays by I. A. L. Diamond
Films shot in Italy
Films shot at Palatino Studios
1970s American films
1970s Italian films